Field Marshal Charles Moore, 1st Marquess of Drogheda  (29 June 1730 – 22 December 1822), styled Viscount Moore from 1752 until 28 October 1758 and then Earl of Drogheda until 2 July 1791, was an Irish peer and later a British peer, and military officer. He bore the colours of his regiment at the Battle of Culloden in April 1746 during the Jacobite risings and later commanded the 18th Light Dragoons during operations against the Whiteboys in Ireland. He also sat as Member of Parliament in the Irish House of Commons and, having served as Chief Secretary to the Lord Lieutenant of Ireland, he went on to become Master-General of the Irish Ordnance.

Career

Born the son of Edward Moore, 5th Earl of Drogheda and Sarah Moore (daughter of Brabazon Ponsonby, 1st Earl of Bessborough), Moore joined the Army in 1744 as a cornet in the 12th Dragoons, and bore the colours at the Battle of Culloden in April 1746 during the Jacobite risings. He was promoted captain in 1750 and reached the rank of major in 1752 and the rank of brevet lieutenant-colonel on 18 January 1755.

In 1757 Moore became Member of Parliament for St Canice. He held the seat until he succeeded as 6th Earl of Drogheda following the death of his father at sea while travelling from England to Dublin in October 1758. He was also elected Grandmaster of the Grand Lodge of Ireland in 1758, a post he held for the next two years. He became Governor of County Meath in January 1759 and lieutenant-colonel commandant of the 19th (later 18th) Light Dragoons on 7 December 1759.

Promoted to brevet colonel of dragoons on 19 February 1762, Moore became honorary colonel of his regiment on 3 August 1762. He commanded the 18th Light Dragoons during operations against the Whiteboys in Ireland which started in 1762. He became Chief Secretary to the Lord Lieutenant of Ireland in 1763, Governor of Kinsale and Charles Fort in 1765 and a Lord Justice of Ireland in 1766. He commissioned Moore Abbey as his country home in 1767 and was appointed Custos Rotulorum of King's County in 1766 and Custos Rotulorum of Queen's County in 1769, both offices for life.

Promoted to major-general on 30 April 1770, Moore became Master-General of the Irish Ordnance and colonel-in-chief of the Royal Irish Artillery in 1770. He became Member of Parliament for Horsham in 1776, and having been promoted to lieutenant-general on 29 August 1777, he was appointed one of the Founder Knights of the Order of St. Patrick on 17 March 1783.

Created Marquess of Drogheda in the Peerage of Ireland in July 1791 in recognition of the support he had given the Government, Moore was promoted to full general on 12 October 1793. He was appointed one of the joint Postmasters General of Ireland in 1797. In January 1801, he was made Baron Moore, of Moore Place in the County of Kent, in the Peerage of the United Kingdom.

Moore served as Muster-Master-General in Ireland from May to November 1807 and was promoted to field marshal on 17 July 1821, aged 91. He was an important patron of the artist William Ashford. He died in Dublin on 22 December 1821 and was buried at St Peter's Church in Drogheda.

Family
Moore married Lady Anne Seymour-Conway, the daughter of Francis Seymour-Conway, 1st Marquess of Hertford, on 15 February 1766. They had eight children, including Charles Moore, 2nd Marquess of Drogheda, Henry, father of the 3rd and last Marquess, Frances, who married John Vandeleur, and Elizabeth, Countess of Westmeath. His wife's family had a tradition of mental illness, which may explain the fact that their elder son went insane in his twenties.

References

Sources

External links

1730 births
People from County Louth
Irish soldiers
British field marshals
Drogheda, Charles Moore, 6th Earl of
Moore, Charles Moore, Viscount
Knights of St Patrick
19th-century Irish people
Drogheda, Charles Moore, 6th Earl of
Moore, Charles Moore, Viscount
Members of the Privy Council of Ireland
Chief Secretaries for Ireland
Marquesses of Drogheda
Peers of the United Kingdom created by George III
1822 deaths